William Goodfellow may refer to:

 William Goodfellow (philanthropist) (1880–1974), New Zealand merchant, industrialist, company director and philanthropist
 William Goodfellow (executive) (born 1947), founding member and executive director of the Center for International Policy
 Bill Goodfellow (William Arthur Goodfellow, 1901–1983), politician in Ontario, Canada
 Douglas Goodfellow (William Douglas Goodfellow, 1917–2014), New Zealand businessman and philanthropist